The 2006 Golden Spin of Zagreb was the 39th edition of an annual senior-level international figure skating competition held in Zagreb, Croatia. It was held at the Dom Sportova between November 16 and 19, 2006. Figure skaters competed in the disciplines of men's singles, ladies' singles, and ice dancing. The Junior-level equivalent was the 2006 Golden Bear of Zagreb. The compulsory dance was the Golden Waltz.

Results

Men

Ladies

Ice dancing

External links
 2006 Golden Spin of Zagreb results

Golden Spin Of Zagreb, 2006
Golden Spin of Zagreb
2000s in Zagreb
Golden Spin Of Zagreb, 2006